The 1985 Giro del Trentino was the ninth edition of the Tour of the Alps cycle race and was held on 7 May to 9 May 1985. The race started in Riva del Garda and finished in Arco. The race was won by Harald Maier.

General classification

References

1985
1985 in road cycling
1985 in Italian sport
May 1985 sports events in Europe